Moustafa Kejo Elmekawi (born 22 October 1994) is an Egyptian basketball player who plays for Zamalek and the Egyptian national team. He plays as a power forward or center.

Professional career
Since 2012, Kejo plays for Zamalek in the Egyptian Basketball Super League. In 2019, he won the Egyptian championship. Kejo was on the roster for the 2021 BAL season, where he started all games for Zamalek and eventually won the BAL championship. He contributed 6.5 points and 6 rebounds per game.

National team career
Kejo plays for the Egyptian national team, where he participated at the 2014 FIBA Basketball World Cup. He also played at AfroBasket 2017 and 2021AfroBasket

BAL career statistics

|-
|style="text-align:left;background:#afe6ba;"|2021†
|style="text-align:left;"|Zamalek
| 6 || 6 || 16.2 || .405 || .000 || .409 || 6.0 || .8 || .5 || .03 || 6.5
|- class="sortbottom"
| style="text-align:center;" colspan="2"|Career
| 6 || 6 || 16.2 || .405 || .000 || .409 || 6.0 || .8 || .5 || .03 || 6.5

References

1994 births
Living people
Egyptian men's basketball players
Point guards
Shooting guards
2014 FIBA Basketball World Cup players
Zamalek SC basketball players